Sooner or Later is the debut studio album of Bob Ostertag, released in 1991 by RecRec Music.

Reception

"Blue" Gene Tyranny of AllMusic gave Sooner or Later four and a half out of five stars.

Track listing

Personnel
Adapted from the Sooner or Later liner notes.

Musicians
 Fred Frith – guitar (2)
 Chaquito – voice
 Bob Ostertag – sampler

Production and design
 Tom Erbe – engineering, mastering
 Lucija Kordic – cover art, design
 David Wojnarowicz – photography

Release history

References

External links 
 Sooner or Later at Bandcamp
 

1991 debut albums
Bob Ostertag albums
RecRec Music albums
Seeland Records albums
LGBT-related albums
Sound collage albums